Mildred Dodge Jeremy Ingalls (April 2, 1911 - March 16, 2000) was an American poet and scholar of Chinese literature.

In 1943, she received a Guggenheim Fellowship to work on her major poem, The Thunder Saga of Tahi, which was published in 1945 by Alfred Knopf.

Life
Ingalls grew up in Gloucester, Massachusetts. She received both her bachelor's and master's degrees from Tufts College and studied Chinese at the University of Chicago. From 1948 to 1960, she taught at Rockford College as Resident Poet and Professor of Asian Studies and served as head of the English Department. She then taught at Western College for Women in Oxford, Ohio.

She had a foster son, Yong-ho Ch'oe.

After Ingalls's death in 2000, Allen Wittenborn, who had met her when he was a graduate student at University of Arizona, later returned to her papers in the archives there. From nearly fifty boxes of her papers he edited the volume Dragon in Ambush: The Art of War in the Poems of Mao Zedong (2013), a translation and explication of 20 of Mao's earliest published poems. A reviewer called the volume "an extraordinary work, so full of information that it seems bursting at its roughly 500-page seams. This is not an entirely good thing, because the information provided, while often rich and resonant, is also frequently far-fetched and the assemblage of contents is somewhat unusual."

Her papers are archived at several institutions: the University of Chicago, the University of Delaware, and the University of Arizona.

Awards
 1941: Yale Series of Younger Poets prize for The Metaphysical Sword
 1943: Guggenheim Fellowship
 1950/1951: Shelley Memorial Award
 American Academy of Arts and Letters Fellowship
 Ford Foundation Fellowship
 Rockefeller Foundation Fellowship

Works

Poetry
 
  2nd edition AMS Press, 1971

Non-fiction

Essays

Translations

References

External links
 "Jeremy Ingalls", Kore Press
 "Jeremy Ingalls: A Study", Kore Press Blog

1911 births
2000 deaths
Chinese–English translators
Rockford University faculty
Tufts University alumni
University of Chicago alumni
Yale Younger Poets winners
20th-century American poets
20th-century translators